Napheesa Collier (born September 23, 1996) is an American professional basketball player for the Minnesota Lynx of the Women’s National Basketball Association (WNBA). After playing college basketball for the University of Connecticut Huskies, Collier was drafted by the Lynx with the 6th overall pick in the 2019 WNBA draft. She participated in the 2020 Summer Olympics games in Tokyo as part of the United States Women's Basketball team that won the Gold Medal.

High school career
In her freshman year, Collier played for Jefferson City High School in Jefferson City, Missouri, where she averaged 17.9 points and 9.8 rebounds. In her sophomore year, she transferred to Incarnate Word Academy, where she averaged a high of 24.6 points and 12 rebounds. Collier also competed on her high school track team. She was the 2013 and 2015 Gatorade Missouri Player of the Year, one of five finalists for the 2015 Naismith Award as national Player of the Year and Women's Basketball Coaches Association High School All-American.

College career

At the end of her UConn career, Collier ranked 3rd in scoring, 4th in rebounds, and 7th in blocks. She ranks 4th in most consecutive starts at UConn, with 112, had 49 career double-doubles, and averaged a double-double (20.8/10.8) her senior season. She became the fifth player in the exclusive 2000/1000 club, joining UConn greats Maya Moore, Tina Charles, Breanna Stewart and Rebecca Lobo. Collier reached the 1000 rebound mark in the game against Louisville, and reached 2000 points in the very next game against Cincinnati. She was a member of the 2016 Connecticut Huskies National Champion team and reached the Final Four in each of her four years at UConn. She received the Katrina McClain Award for Power Forward of the Year from the Naismith Memorial Basketball Hall of Fame in her senior season. She was an AP 1st Team All-American in both her senior and sophomore seasons, and 2nd Team in her junior season. Collier has the most rebounds (411) in a season at UConn, and finished 2nd with most points in a season at 792 points, trailing only Maya Moore. As a duo, Collier and Katie Lou Samuelson scored the most points in UConn WBB history (4688), topping B. Stewart and M. Jefferson, two teammates from their freshman season.

WNBA

Minnesota Lynx (2019-Present)
Collier was selected by the Minnesota Lynx as the 6th overall pick in the 2019 WNBA draft. She was asked to play small forward, then power forward, and later, small forward. In her first WNBA game, Collier scored 27 points against the Chicago Sky, the second-highest debut ever for any rookie (after Candace Parker). She played 33.3 mpg, more minutes per game than any other WNBA player.

She is the second rookie (after Tamika Catchings) in WNBA history to score 400 points, 200 rebounds and 60 steals. Collier is the fourth player (after Maya Moore, Catchings and Sheryl Swoopes) to have a season with 400 points, 200 rebounds, 75 assists, 50 steals, 25 blocks and 25 made three-pointers. Collier was voted to the 2019 WNBA All-Rookie Team, and became an All-Star as an injury replacement for A'ja Wilson.

For the season, Collier averaged 13.3 points, 6.6 rebounds, 2.6 assists, 1.9 steals and 0.9 blocks. She shot 49.0% from the field, 36.1% from three, and 79.2% from the free throw line. She was chosen ESPNW, Associated Press, and WNBA Rookie of the Year.

In the 2020 season while in the WNBA bubble, Collier started a podcast with A'ja Wilson, Tea with A & Phee.

National team career
In June 2021, Collier was named to the United States Women's Olympic basketball team to compete in Tokyo, Japan during the 2020 Summer Olympics, marking her first selection.

WNBA career statistics

Regular season

|-
| align="left" | 2019
| align="left" | Minnesota
| 34 || 34 || 33.3 || .490 || .361 || .792 || 6.6 || 2.6 || 1.9 || 0.9 || 1.9 || 13.1
|-
| align="left" | 2020
| align="left" | Minnesota
| 22 || 22 || 34.2 || .523 || .408 || .829 || 9.0 || 3.3 || 1.8 || 1.3 || 2.7 || 16.1
|-
| align="left" | 2021
| align="left" | Minnesota
| 29 || 29 || 34.6 || .441 || .253 || .860 || 6.6 || 3.2 || 1.3 || 1.3 || 2.3 || 16.2
|-
| align="left" | 2022
| align="left" | Minnesota
| 4 || 4 || 22.8 || .423 || .286 || .714 || 3.0 || 1.0 || 0.5 || 0.3 || 0.3 || 7.3
|-
| align="left" | Career
| align="left" | 4 years, 1 team
| 89 || 89 || 33.4 || .478 || .329 || .826 || 7.0 || 2.9 || 1.6 || 1.1 || 2.2 || 14.6

Playoffs

|-
| align="left" | 2019
| align="left" | Minnesota
| 1 || 1 || 38.0 || .727 || .333 || .500 || 10.0 || 3.0 || 2.0 || 1.0 || 4.0 || 19.0
|-
| align="left" | 2020
| align="left" | Minnesota
| 4 || 4 || 34.3 || .500 || .538 || .625 || 9.0 || 3.0 || 0.5 || 2.5 || 2.0 || 16.5
|-
| align="left" | 2021
| align="left" | Minnesota
| 1 || 1 || 35.0 || .273 || 1.000 || .000 || 4.0 || 2.0 || 3.0 || 0.0 || 4.0 || 8.0
|-
| align="left" | Career
| align="left" | 3 years, 1 team
| 6 || 6 || 35.0 || .500 || .556 || .583 || 8.3 || 2.8 || 1.2 || 1.8 || 2.3 || 15.5

Career statistics

College

Personal life
Collier is the granddaughter of Gershon Collier, a Sierra Leone Creole lawyer, former ambassador to the United Nations, former ambassador to the United States, and, briefly, chief justice of Sierra Leone. Later, an expatriate, educator, and Yankees and Giants fan, he died two years before she was born. Her father, Gamal Collier, explained to The New York Times that he brought up Napheesa to know the "importance of self-sufficiency and responsibility and upholding the family name." Gershon had helped Sierra Leone gain its independence from Great Britain in 1961.

Her younger brother Kai plays football at Lindenwood University in St. Charles, Missouri.

Off the court, Collier loves to read, especially mystery novels by Ruth Ware. In October 2019, she became engaged to Alex Bazzell, a basketball skills coach. In November 2021 they announced they are expecting their first child, a baby girl. On May 25, 2022, Collier gave birth to a baby girl, Mila Sarah Bazzell.

References

External links
 
 

1996 births
Living people
All-American college women's basketball players
American women's basketball players
Basketball players at the 2014 Summer Youth Olympics
Basketball players at the 2020 Summer Olympics
Basketball players from Missouri
McDonald's High School All-Americans
Minnesota Lynx draft picks
Minnesota Lynx players
Medalists at the 2020 Summer Olympics
Olympic gold medalists for the United States in basketball
Parade High School All-Americans (girls' basketball)
Power forwards (basketball)
Sierra Leone Creole people
Sportspeople from Jefferson City, Missouri
UConn Huskies women's basketball players
Youth Olympic gold medalists for the United States
American people of Sierra Leonean descent
Sportspeople of Sierra Leonean descent
United States women's national basketball team players
Women's National Basketball Association All-Stars
African-American basketball players